Yeleswaram Mandal is one of the 21 mandals in Kakinada District of Andhra Pradesh. As per census 2011, there are 13 villages.

Demographics 
Yeleswaram Mandal has total population of 77,965 as per the Census 2011 out of which 38,471 are males while 39,494 are females and the Average Sex Ratio of Yeleswaram Mandal is 1,027. The total literacy rate of Yeleswaram Mandal is 62.86%. The male literacy rate is 58.42% and the female literacy rate is 53.25%.

Towns and villages

Villages 

Bhadravaram
East Lakshmipuram
J. Annavaram
Lakkavaram
Lingamparthi
Marriveedu
Peddanapalle
Peravaram
Ramanayyapeta
Siripuram
Tirumali
Kambalapalem
Yeleswaram
Yerravaram

See also 
List of mandals in Andhra Pradesh

References 

Mandals in Kakinada district